Davy Litten (born 3 May 2003) is an English professional rugby league footballer who plays as a  and er for Hull F.C. in the Betfred Super League.

In 2022 he made his Hull début in the Super League against Wakefield Trinity.

References

External links
Hull FC profile

2003 births
Living people
English rugby league players
Hull F.C. players
Rugby league fullbacks
Rugby league players from Kingston upon Hull
Rugby league wingers
Whitehaven R.L.F.C. players